MasterChef Pakistan ( / ) is a Pakistani competitive cooking reality television game show based on the original British  MasterChef. The first season, began on 3 May 2014, and aired on Urdu 1. The show aired two episodes weekly: one on Saturday and another on Sunday at the 21:00 PST prime-time slot. The first season was presented by Knorr and co-sponsorship rights were owned by Ariel while Shan Food Industries and 7 Up served as food providers.

The first season of MasterChef Pakistan won by Ammara Noman who defeated Gulnaz and Madiha in series Finale on 27 July 2014. Ammara received series title, PKR 5 million (US $ 50,000) and a contract of her own recipe book. Gulnaz stood as a runner-up and received Rs. 1 million with a series trophy while Madiha came up as 2nd runner-up and received Rs. 500,000 and a series trophy.

Regional auditions
Audition were held at the following places. The listing is in chronological order:

Auditions for the first series occurred only in three metropolises: the capitol Islamabad, the Heart Lahore and the industrial hub Karachi. People showed enthusiasm for the auditions. In Lahore auditions days were extended due to their great reception, and in Karachi, auditions were extended for two more days.

Audition structure
The auditions for season 1 of MasterChef Pakistan  followed almost the same format as of the MasterChef series, similar to Australia and India. There were three rounds, the first being the open call audition advertised. Auditioners registered themselves via forms at the series' website, and then called for auditions at the venue, to which they bring their cold dishes. Those who gain two yeses from the judges then gain the red apron for the next round.

In the second round, the selected auditioners face a live cooking challenge, where in one hour they have to present their dishes to the judges. Half of those who attended are eliminated at this stage, and the rest  are "white apron" auditioners selected to proceed further.

In the third round, half of those selected have to face a boot camp challenge where their cutting skills and speed are judged. Here a further selection occurs, with only 16 or 17 participants moving on.

In the first season, unlike India and Australia, MasterChef did not air audition episodes, but directly aired with the selected initial contestants. The first season follows the live cooking challenge round and the boot camp challenge.

Judges
The first season of the series was hosted and judged by the following panel of acclaimed Pakistani chefs:
 Chef Zakir Qureshi 
 Chef Mehboob Khan
 Chef Khurram Awan

Challenges prior to finals

Live cooking challenge
After the regional auditions in Islamabad, Lahore and Karachi, the judges selected 100 contestants who came from all over Pakistan to venues. All 100 contestants faced a live cooking challenge, where they were given one hour to present their dishes to the judges. From among these contestants, the pool of contestants was narrowed down to 50 by giving a white apron to each, for the next round.

Boot camp challenge
The second phase was the boot camp challenge, where the selected 50 contestants' cutting and techniques of cooking were judged by giving them different kitchen chores. Here a further selection occurred, and the top 50 were narrowed down to the final top 16. Boot camp included two or three phases in order to select the last final contestants who would fight for the series' title.

Contestants

Opening week
The opening week of MasterChef Pakistan saw 100 contestants competing for the 16 positions in the main competition. After facing the live cooking challenge, the top 50 were revealed in the second episode. They then faced the boot camp challenge. The top 30 were shown in episode 3. Finally after facing the last boot camp challenge, the top 16 were revealed, who would appear in the main competition.

Top 16
The full top 16 were revealed on Sunday, 11 May.

Guest judges
The following celebrity chefs appears as guest judges in the series:
 Chef Shai - Elimination Challenge 4, week 6.
 Chef Saddat Siddiqi - Elimination Challenge 6, week 8

Episodes
The following is the complete happening of MasterChef Pakistan (series 1) from auditions to finals.

Elimination chart

  The chef consequently won immunity.
  The chef consequently won immunity pin. 
  The chef consequently won Mystery Box Challenge.

  From week 1 to week 2, Live Cooking Challenges and Boot Camp Challenges occurs among the chosen 100 contestants from the auditions. Week 2 completes with the selection of Top 16 finalists for the series main competition. 
  In week 3, Individual challenges were occur. In first challenge Mariam won the advantage. In second challenge Top 3 and Bottom 3 were evaluated, among Top 3, Ammara won the challenge and got Immunity for next challenge, while by looking at the contestants enthusiasm and effort, Judges decided the elimination to be expunged. 
  In Egg stiffness challenge Zain won the advantage. In second part Mystery Box challenge were exhibited by contestants, in a result, Madiha won the challenge among Top 3, while Bottom 3 results were put on hold for next week to announce the elimination. Ali Shah eliminates as being in Bottom 3, while Anila and Adnan join Top 15. 
  Madiha used his advantages as per winner from last challenge. Birriyani Challenge ends up with the Madiha, Anila and Ammara in Top 3, while Madiha become the challenge winner, while Amina, Adnan, Saad, Rayyan and Azam comes in Bottom 5, they have to face their first elimination challenge and among them who lose will be eliminated. 
  Bottom 5 faces elimination challenge, Amna gets saved in first challenge after winning advantage, while Bottom 4 faces second challenge among them Adnan loses challenge and gets eliminated. 
  Madiha became the captain of Blue of team as per the advantage of winning last challenge. Both Teams face outdoor challenge, the Red Team won and gets saved, while the entire losing Blue Team had to face elimination challenge in MasterChef Kitchen. 
  Blue Team face elimination Challenge, Amna, Gulnaz and Sidra appears as Top 3, while Rayyan, Marriam, Madiha and Anila as Bottom 4, among them Anila gets eliminated 
  Top 13, faces International Cuisine Challenge, Amna, Azam, Saad, Sidra and Gulnaz appears as a Top 5, there was no bottom count for this challenge. 
  In first challenge Saad won the advantages as winner. Second challenge of Chef Shai ends up with Amna, Khurram, Muddasir, Mariam and Zain as bottom 5 among them Muddasir gets eliminated, there was no top count for this challenge.
  Contestants face their second outdoor challenge, in which Blue Team won the challenge and gets saved while, entire Red team appears as a Bottom 6 to face elimination challenge 5
  Red Team contestants faces Mystery Box elimination challenge, in which Azam gets eliminated, there was no top count. 
  Amna and Marriam appears as Top 2, while Amna won Immunity and being on 2nd position Mariam won advantage. 
  Contestants face Clebrity Chef Challenge, Sidra lose challenge after coming in Bottom 3 and gets eliminated, while Zain won the Challenge after appearing in Top 3. 
  Amna, Khurrum, Matiam and Gulnaz appears as Top 4, while Gulnaz gets the immunity pin. 
  Khurrum became the winner of challenge as being in Top 3 and Iqra eliminates as being in Bottom 3. 
  Amara, Zain and Madiha were chosen as Top 3 on their dish basis, and they get saved from elimination challenge. 
  Mariam gets eliminated after appearing in Bottom 3, there was no top count for that challenge. 
  After facing Offsite challenge, Team Red get saved while other entire team went into elimination challenge. 
  Mariam was in Bottom 4, but get saved after passing Advantage Challenge prior to final elimination challenge, while Saad gets eliminated after losing elimination challenge. 
  Zain, Amna and Gulnaz appears as a Bottom 3, while zain gets eliminated on the basis of his dish results. 
  Gulnaz used her Immunity pin and get saved before the challenge. While among Bottom 2, Khurrum gets eliminated from the series. 
  Rayyan and Amna failed to reach the Finals and gets eliminated. Madiha, Gulnaz and Ammara appears as a Top 3 finalist of Season 1.

Notes
a: Mystery Box challenge were exhibited but there was no winner concluded, Judges only announced Bottom counts. 
b: Judges announce that from now on to Grand Finale every episode, elimination will be carried out.
c: Double elimination occurs in semifinal round.

See also
 MasterChef

References

Further reading

External links 
 

MasterChef Pakistan
2014 Pakistani television seasons